XHZA-FM is a radio station in Toluca, State of Mexico. Broadcasting on 101.3 FM, XHZA is owned by Grupo Ultra and is known as Ultra 101.3.

History
XHZA received its concession on June 28, 1972. It was owned by Arturo Zorrilla Martínez, the founder of Ultra.

References

External links
Radiorama Stations

Radio stations in the State of Mexico